Megachile fullawayi is a species of bee in the family Megachilidae. It is present in Hawaii, the Northern Mariana Islands, and Guam. It was described by Theodore Dru Alison Cockerell in 1914.

References

Fullawayi
Insects described in 1914